Wolga is a monotypic genus of rotifers belonging to the family Trichotriidae. The only species is Wolga spinifera.

The species is found in Europe.

References

Ploima
Rotifers